Minuscule 60 (in the Gregory-Aland numbering), ε 1321 (Von Soden), is a Greek minuscule manuscript of the New Testament, on parchment leaves. It is dated by a colophon to the year 1297. It has complex contents,  marginalia are incomplete.

Description 

The codex contains complete text of the four Gospels and Revelation on 291 leaves (size ). The text is written elegantly in one column per page, 24-26 lines per page.

The text is also divided into the Ammonian Sections, but curiously no references to the Eusebian Canons on a margin of the text.

It has a few scholia from Arethas. 

Together with the codex 2821 it belongs to the same manuscript. Folios 4-294 belong to the codex 60, folios 295-316 – to the codex 2821.

Text 

The Greek text of the codex is a representative of the Byzantine text-type. Hermann von Soden classified it to the textual family Kx. Kurt Aland placed it in Category V. 
According to the Claremont Profile Method it represents textual cluster 1685, and it is closely related to Kx.

History 

Micheal ο μαντυλιδης wrote this manuscript for Georg τον μουγδουφον. The manuscript once belonged to Bishop Moore (along with minuscule 440), after his death in 1714 to King George I, who gave it to the Cambridge University. 

It was examined by John Mill (as Moori 1), Richard Bentley (as o'), and Franz Delitzsch. C. R. Gregory saw it in 1886.

It is currently housed in at the Cambridge University Library (Dd. 9.69, fol. 4–294), at Cambridge.

See also 

 List of New Testament minuscules
 Biblical manuscript
 Textual criticism

References

Further reading 

 Franz Delitzsch, "Studien zur Entstehungsgeschichte der Polyglottenbibel des  Cardinal Ximenes", Leipzig 1871. 

Greek New Testament minuscules
12th-century biblical manuscripts